Ibrahim Arslanovic (born 1952) is a Croatian former footballer who played in the National Soccer League, and North American Soccer League.

Career 
Arslanovic played with Toronto Croatia in the National Soccer League in 1973. He re-signed with Croatia for the 1974 season.  In 1975, he signed with Toronto Metros-Croatia in the North American Soccer League, where he appeared in three matches. For the remainder of the 1975 season he returned to play with Toronto Croatia in the NSL. He returned to play with Toronto Croatia for the 1977 season.

References 

1952 births
Living people
Croatian footballers
Yugoslav footballers
Yugoslav expatriate footballers
Toronto Croatia players
Toronto Blizzard (1971–1984) players
Canadian National Soccer League players
North American Soccer League (1968–1984) players
Association football midfielders
Expatriate soccer players in Canada
Yugoslav expatriate sportspeople in Canada